"Do You Love Me" is a 1981 dance/soul single by Patti Austin, from the album Every Home Should Have One.  Along with the track "The Genie", the single peaked at number one on the dance charts for two weeks.  Although "Do You Love Me" failed to chart on the Hot 100, it peaked at number twenty-four on the soul singles chart.

Chart positions

References

1981 singles
Patti Austin songs
Dance-pop songs
1981 songs
Songs written by Rod Temperton
Post-disco songs